Sofya Aleksandrovna Yanovskaya (also Janovskaja; ; 31 January 1896 – 24 October 1966) was a Soviet mathematician and historian, specializing in the history of mathematics, mathematical logic, and philosophy of mathematics. She is best known for her efforts in restoring the research of mathematical logic in the Soviet Union and publishing and editing the mathematical works of Karl Marx.

Biography
Yanovskaya was born in Pruzhany, a town near Brest, to a Jewish family of accountant Alexander Neimark. From 1915 to 1918, she studied in a woman's college in Odessa, when she became a communist. She worked as a party official until 1924, when she started teaching at the Institute of Red Professoriate. With exception of the war years (1941–1945), she worked at Moscow State University until retirement.

Engels had noted in his writings that Karl Marx had written some mathematics. Yanonskaya found Marx's ''Mathematical Manuscripts'' and she arranged for their first publication in 1933 in Russian. She received her doctoral degree in 1935.  
Her work on Karl Marx's mathematical manuscripts began in 1930s and may have had some influence on the study of non-standard analysis in China.  In the academia she is most remembered now for her work on history and philosophy of mathematics, as well as for her influence on young generation of researchers. She persuaded Ludwig Wittgenstein when he was visiting Soviet Union in 1935 to give up his idea to relocate to the Soviet Union. In 1968 Yanovskaya arranged for a better publication of Marx's work.

She died from diabetes in Moscow.

Awards and honours
For her work, Yanovskaya received the Order of Lenin and other medals.

References

Sources
 Irving Anellis (1987) "The heritage of S.A. Janovskaja". History and Philosophy of Logic 8: 45-56.
 B.A. Kushner (1996) "Sof'ja Aleksandrovna Janovskaja: a few reminiscences", Modern Logic 6: 67-72.
 V.A. Bazhanov (2002) Essays on the Social History of Logic in Russia. Simbirsk-Ulyanovsk. Chapter 5 (bibliography of S.A. Yanovskaya's works is presented here). (in Russian).
 B.V. Biryukov and L.G. Biryukova (2004) "Ludwig Wittgenstein and Sof'ya Aleksandrovna Yanovskaya. The 'Cambridge Genius' becomes acquainted with Soviet mathematicians in the 1930s" (in Russian). Logical Investigations. No. 11 (Russian), 46-94, Nauka, Moscow.

Further reading
 "Sof'ya Aleksandrovna Janovskaja", Biographies of Women Mathematicians, Agnes Scott College
 Remembrances and more remembrances of S.A. Yanovskaya, by Boris A. Kushner (in Russian). 
 a review of Yanovskaya's  Methodological problems in science monograph – an article  by B.V. Biryukov and O.A. Borisova (in Russian).

 1965 Moscow Interview with Sofya Yanovskaya, Eugene Dynkin Collection of Mathematics Interviews, Cornell University Library (in Russian).
 Vadim Valilyev on the meeting between Ludwig Wittgenstein and Sophia Yanovskaya (in Russian).

1896 births
1966 deaths
People from Pruzhany
People from Pruzhansky Uyezd
Belarusian Jews
Jews from the Russian Empire
Soviet Jews
Bolsheviks
Communist Party of the Soviet Union members
Soviet historians
Soviet mathematicians
Soviet women mathematicians
Historians of science
Historians of mathematics
Jewish scientists
Jewish historians
Philosophers of mathematics
20th-century women mathematicians
Soviet women historians
Institute of Red Professors alumni
Recipients of the Order of Lenin